= Ann My Dice =

Dutch metalcore band

- Origin: Rotterdam, Netherlands
- Genres: Metalcore
- Years active: 2011–present
- Label: Profane
- Members: Jorn de Kleine; Tim van Vliet; Ian Izeboud; Nils Stok; Sofièn Ziel
- Website: https://www.annmydice.nl

Ann My Dice is a 5-piece metalcore act from the Netherlands.

The band released their first full-length album To Start A Journey on 6 September 2015 through Profane Records. In January 2019, the group won the Audience Award at Utrecht Popprijs, a band competition in Utrecht. The band released a single and accompanying music video called "Whisper in the Dark" on 25 March 2019, teasing the release of their EP Thorn, which was released 19 April 2019. The band then released 3 singles, “In Vain” (2020), “Deliver Us” (2021) and “World In Ember” (2023). The band released their EP "STRAIN" in 2025.

== Members ==
- Nils Stok - Lead vocals/Guitar
- Sofièn Ziel - Lead vocals/Backing vocals
- Ian Izeboud - Guitar
- Tim van Vliet - Drums
- Jorn de Kleine - Bass

== Discography ==
- Demo 2013
- Wreckage (single, 2014)
- Never Back Down (single, 2014)
- To Start A Journey (2015, Profane)
- Thorn (EP 2019, Profane)
- In Vain (single, 2020)
- Deliver Us (single, 2021)
- World In Ember (single, 2023)
- STRAIN (EP, 2025)
- ?????? (2026)
